California's 29th State Assembly district is one of 80 California State Assembly districts. It is currently represented by Democrat Mark Stone of Scotts Valley.

District profile 
The district encompasses the Monterey Bay shoreline and the coastal Monterey Bay Area. A sizable section of southern San Jose is also included in the district.

Monterey County – 42.5%
 Carmel
 Carmel Valley
 Del Rey Oaks
 Marina
 Monterey
 Pacific Grove
 Prunedale
 Sand City
 Seaside

Santa Clara County – 5.2%
 San Jose – 9.2%

Santa Cruz County – 74.8%
 Aptos
 Ben Lomond
 Boulder Creek
 Brookdale
 Capitola
 Felton
 Santa Cruz
 Scotts Valley

Election results from statewide races

List of Assembly Members 
Due to redistricting, the 29th district has been moved around different parts of the state. The current iteration resulted from the 2011 redistricting by the California Citizens Redistricting Commission.

Election results 1992 - present

2020

2018

2016

2014

2012

2010

2008

2006

2004

2002

2000

1998

1996

1994

1992

See also 
 California State Assembly
 California State Assembly districts
 Districts in California

References

External links 
 District map from the California Citizens Redistricting Commission

29
Government of Monterey County, California
Government of Santa Clara County, California
Government of Santa Cruz County, California
Aptos, California
Carmel-by-the-Sea, California
Monterey, California
Pacific Grove, California
San Jose, California
Santa Cruz, California